Moscow Mills is a city in Lincoln County, Missouri, United States. The population was 2,509 at the 2010 census.

History
Moscow Mills was laid out in 1821, and named for a watermill of the same name near the original town site.

The Old Rock House was listed on the National Register of Historic Places in 1972.

Geography
Moscow Mills is located on the west bank of the Cuivre River just east of U.S. Route 61 on Missouri Route C. Troy is approximately 3.25 miles to the northwest on Route 61.

Demographics

2010 census
As of the census of 2010, there were 2,509 people, 873 households, and 641 families living in the city. The racial makeup of the city was 91.6% White, 3.7% African American, 0.1% Native American, 0.4% Asian, 0.9% from other races, and 3.1% from two or more races. Hispanic or Latino of any race were 2.0% of the population.

There were 873 households, of which 45.6% had children under the age of 18 living with them, 44.6% were married couples living together, 22.8% had a female householder with no husband present, 6.1% had a male householder with no wife present, and 26.6% were non-families. 20.5% of all households were made up of individuals, and 5.2% had someone living alone who was 65 years of age or older. The average household size was 2.82 and the average family size was 3.21.

The median age in the city was 30.7 years. 32.4% of residents were under the age of 18; 9.1% were between the ages of 18 and 24; 28% were from 25 to 44; 21.6% were from 45 to 64; and 8.9% were 65 years of age or older. The gender makeup of the city was 48.3% male and 51.7% female.

2000 census
As of the census of 2000, there were 1,742 people, 609 households, and 453 families living in the city. The racial makeup of the city was 94.32% White, 3.16% African American, 0.34% Native American, 0.11% Asian, 0.29% from other races, and 1.78% from two or more races. Hispanic or Latino of any race were 0.92% of the population.

There were 609 households, out of which 45.8% had children under the age of 18 living with them, 47.5% were married couples living together, 19.0% had a female householder with no husband present, and 25.6% were non-families. 18.4% of all households were made up of individuals, and 3.4% had someone living alone who was 65 years of age or older. The average household size was 2.86 and the average family size was 3.21.

In the city the population was spread out, with 34.4% under the age of 18, 11.1% from 18 to 24, 35.1% from 25 to 44, 14.4% from 45 to 64, and 5.1% who were 65 years of age or older. The median age was 28 years. For every 100 females, there were 94.4 males. For every 100 females age 18 and over, there were 90.5 males.

The median income for a household in the city was $37,067, and the median income for a family was $42,083. Males had a median income of $30,264 versus $21,667 for females. The per capita income for the city was $14,555. About 5.3% of families and 8.7% of the population were below the poverty line, including 8.9% of those under age 18 and 8.7% of those age 65 or over.

Education
The Lincoln County R-III School District serves Moscow Mills.

References

External links

 
 Historic maps of Moscow Mills in the Sanborn Maps of Missouri Collection at the University of Missouri

Cities in Lincoln County, Missouri
Cities in Missouri
1821 establishments in Missouri